The World Boardgaming Championships is a convention held yearly since 1999 by the Boardgame Players Association.  It was previously held in Lancaster, Pennsylvania, but it moved to the Seven Springs Mountain Resort in 2016. It is next scheduled for July 24 to August 1, 2021, at Seven Springs Mountain Resort near Pittsburgh, PA. This convention replaced Avaloncon, which had been run from 1991 to 1998 by Avalon Hill.

Each year, the convention pulls approximately 2,000 people from around the world to compete to be named champion of their favorite games. The 100 best-attended games from the previous convention (the “Century”) are scheduled, with additional games added by vote of BPA members and through sponsorships. It is not necessary to be invited or to be an expert player to compete in tournaments. Many events include scheduled demonstrations that explain the rules.

See also
 Charles S. Roberts Award

References

External links
World Boardgaming Championships

Gaming conventions
World championships in board games